Tea Leaf Green is the debut studio album by Tea Leaf Green. It was released on November 27, 1999, by Bongo Boy.

Track listing
All songs written by Trevor Garrod. 
 "Steal Your Imagination" - 3:52
 "Cherry Red Guitar" - 4:23
 "Apocalyptic Cowboy" - 5:24
 "California" - 4:31
 "Crackers and Cheese" - 3:47
 "Professor's Blues" - 7:11
 "New Year's Eve" - 4:55
 "Ocean View" - 5:19
 "Boomtown" - 4:43
 "Passion" - 4:42
 "Asphalt Funk" - 4:39
 "Turn the Page" - 3:57

1999 debut albums
Tea Leaf Green albums